Valoniaceae is a family of green algae in the order Cladophorales.

References

External links

Ulvophyceae families
Cladophorales